Trachiniformes is an order of percomorph bony fish which is traditionally the suborder Trachinoidei of the Perciformes. 

However, the classification is also considered as a polyphyly by molecular phylogenies. Trachinidae itself is eventually part of Percoidei. Other members are respectively belongs to Scombriformes, Gobiiformes, new orders Uranoscopiformes, Pempheriformes, and other clades in Perciformes.

Timeline of genera

Families
The following families make up the Trachiniformes: (with respectively belonging taxa following the molecular phylogenies)

 Ammodytidae Bonaparte, 1832  - sandeels or sandlances (considered as part of Uranoscopiformes).
 Chiasmodontidae Jordan & Gilbert, 1883 - the swallowers (considered as part of Scombriformes).
 Champsodontidae Jordan & Snyder, 1902 - gulpers, gapers or crocodile toothfishes (considered as part of Pempheriformes).
 Cheimarrichthyidae Regan, 1913 - New Zealand torrentfishes (considered as part of Uranoscopiformes).
 Creediidae Waite, 1899 - sandburrowers (considered as part  of Pempheriformes).
 Leptoscopidae Gill, 1859 - southern sandfishes (considered as part of Pempheriformes).
 Percophidae Swainson, 1839 - duckbills (as a polyphyly, respectively part of Pempheriformes and Perciformes (Notothenioidei and Bembropoidei)).
 Pinguipedidae Günther, 1860 - sandperches (considered as part of Uranoscopiformes).
 Trachinidae Rafinesque, 181 - weeverfishes (considered as part of Percoidei, belong to Perciformes).
 Trichodontidae Bleeker, 1859 - sandfish (considered as a part of Cottoidei, belong to Scorpaeniformes).
 Trichonotidae Günther, 1861 - sanddivers (considered to formed the monotypic Trichonotoidei, belong to Gobiiformes).
 Uranoscopidae Bonaparte, 1831 - stargazers (considered as part of Uranoscopiformes).

References

 

 
Polyphyletic groups